The 1989 Men's European Volleyball Championship was the sixteenth edition of the event, organized by Europe's governing volleyball body, the European Volleyball Confederation. It was hosted in Örebro and Stockholm, Sweden, from September 23 to October 1, 1989.

Teams

Group A – Stockholm
 
 
 
 

 

Group B – Örebro

Preliminary round

Group A

Group B

Final round

Final ranking

Team Roster
Andrea Anastasi, Lorenzo Bernardi, Marco Bracci, Luca Cantagalli, Ferdinando De Giorgi, Andrea Gardini, Andrea Lucchetta, Stefano Margutti, Roberto Masciarelli, Gilberto Passani, Paolo Tofoli, and Andrea Zorzi.Head Coach: Julio Velasco.

References
 Results

Men's European Volleyball Championships
E
Volleyball Championship
V
V
1980s in Stockholm
September 1989 sports events in Europe
October 1989 sports events in Europe
Sports competitions in Örebro